Ololygon jureia is a species of frog in the family Hylidae.
It is endemic to Brazil.
Its natural habitats are subtropical or tropical moist lowland forests and intermittent freshwater marshes.
It is threatened by habitat loss.
It takes its name from the Juréia Massif in the Juréia-Itatins Ecological Station, where it has been found.

References

Sources
  Juréia Itatins

jureia
Endemic fauna of Brazil
Amphibians described in 1991
Taxonomy articles created by Polbot
Fauna of the Atlantic Forest